Portsmouth Township may refer to:

 Portsmouth Township, Michigan
 Portsmouth Township, Carteret County, North Carolina, in Carteret County, North Carolina

Township name disambiguation pages